Henry Gant was an American Negro league third baseman between 1887 and 1891.

Gant played for the Pittsburgh Keystones in 1887 and for the Cuban Giants and  New York Gorhams in 1891. In 12 recorded games, he posted 16 hits and six RBI in 57 plate appearances.

References

External links
Baseball statistics and player information from Baseball-Reference Black Baseball Stats and Seamheads

Year of birth missing
Year of death missing
Place of birth missing
Place of death missing
Cuban Giants players
New York Gorhams players
Pittsburgh Keystones players
Baseball third basemen